Hilton Santa Monica Hotel & Suites is a 286-room hotel in Santa Monica, California, in the United States.

History 
Built in 1990, the eight-floor hotel was last renovated in 2021. Previously operated by DoubleTree Suites as a 253-room hotel, the Hilton Santa Monica reopened in April 2021 following a two-year redesign and renovation. Additional rooms were added by splitting presidential suites and relocating the lounge.

In 2022, someone filed a lawsuit against the hotel for allegedly recording phone calls without warning.

Features 
The hotel has 7,773 square feet of meeting space and a rooftop pool. All rooms have modular dining tables with power outlets to function as workstations, and the hotel's tech lounge has charging stations and long tables for coworking.

Monica's operates as the hotel's signature restaurant as of 2022. The menu includes West Coast fish and produce.

See also 

 List of hotels in the United States

References

External links 

 Hilton Santa Monica Hotel & Suites at Hilton.com

1990 establishments in California
Buildings and structures in Santa Monica, California
Hilton Hotels & Resorts hotels
Hotel buildings completed in 1990
Hotels in California